Hairu may refer to:

 HD 7199 b (planet), Star Emiw, Constellation Tucana; aka HIP 5529 b; named after the Makhuwa word for unity
 Hairu FC (soccer), Ngazidja, Comoros; a soccer team; see List of football clubs in the Comoros
 Hairu Ihei, a fictional character from Tokyo Ghoul, see List of Tokyo Ghoul characters
 Hairu Zhang (Zhang Hairu), a Ganzhou Communist Party Chief, predecessor to Pan Yiyang

See also

 Jauro Hairu, Yola North, Limawa, Adamawa, Nigeria; a village; see List of villages in Adamawa State